Russ Petranto is an American television director. His directing credits includes, Too Close for Comfort, Sanford and Son (and its spin-off Sanford Arms), C.P.O. Sharkey, Rocky Road, Full House, The Munsters Today, Out of This World, She's the Sheriff and Down to Earth.

In 1992, Petranto directed for the ABC News Presentation, titled, The Best of Barbara Walters Legends: The New Generation.

References

External links 

Living people
Place of birth missing (living people)
Year of birth missing (living people)
American television directors